Bobos River may refer to:

Bobos River (Guatemala)
Bobos River (Mexico)

See also
Bobo River, New South Wales, Australia